Yudu County is a county under the administration of the prefecture-level city of Ganzhou, located in the south of Jiangxi province, China. It is located in the east of Ganzhou City. It is adjacent to Ruijin City to the east, Huichang County and Anyuan County to the south, Ganxian District to the west, and Xingguo County and Ningdu County to the north. With a total area of 2893 square kilometers, it has jurisdiction over 9 towns and 14 townships, with a total registered population of 1.115 million. The county government is stationed in Gongjiang Town .

The territory belongs to the Hakka Culture (Southern Jiangxi) Ecological Protection Experimental Zone. In 2019, the total production value was 26.62 billion yuan. The "Master Plan for the Development of Ruixing in the Economic Revitalization Pilot Zone" was officially approved by the National Development and Reform Commission. The pilot zone covers the three counties/cities of Ruijin, Xingguo and Yudu, with a total population of approximately 2.3 million. The plan envisages that Ruixing will be built in the experimental zone into a "special economic zone in the old revolutionary base areas" and "experimental zone in the special zone".

In March 2019, it ranked among the first batch of counties in the revolutionary cultural relics protection and utilization area.  On May 20, 2019, General Secretary Xi Jinping came to Jiangxi for investigation. During the investigation, he went to Yudu County to present a flower basket to the Monument to the Long March of the Central Red Army. On April 26, 2020, Yudu County was removed from the list of poverty-stricken counties.

History 
Yudu County was established in the year 201 BC (Han Dynasty). It is known as the "mother of six counties" and "the three provinces of Fujian, Guangdong and Hunan". The name Yudu came from its highest mountain, Yushan Mountain, and was renamed to "" in 1951. In 1934 the county was the starting point of the Long March for the First Red Army.

Yudu County was the Southern Jiangxi Provincial Committee of the Communist Party of China during the Central Soviet Area and the seat of the Soviet Government of Southern Jiangxi Province. One of the Red County and one of the places where the spirit of the Soviet Area was formed, 16 generals of the Republic were born.

Administrative divisions
Yudu County has 9 towns and 14 townships. 
9 towns

14 townships

Climate

Gallery

Transport
 Ganzhou–Longyan Railway

References

Ganzhou
County-level divisions of Jiangxi